Anthony Robles (born July 15, 1988) is an American wrestler who won the 2010–11 NCAA individual wrestling championship in the 125-pound weight class despite being born with only one leg. He is the author of the book Unstoppable: From Underdog to Undefeated: How I Became a Champion (Gotham Books), which went on-sale September 27, 2012.

Youth
Robles was born with only one leg for unknown reasons, but refused to wear a prosthetic leg, removing it at the age of 3. Due to his leg missing all the way up to the hip, he has no stump to attach a prosthetic limb to. He endeavored to work around his missing leg, strengthening his body with various exercises. When Robles was in the sixth grade, he set a record for the most pushups by a member of his school. He began wrestling in the eighth grade, joining in while watching one of his older cousins practice. As a freshman in high school Robles had a record of 5–8 and ranked last in the city of Mesa, Arizona, disadvantaged by being 10 pounds underweight for his weight class. Robles benefited, however, from tremendous grip strength from his use of crutches. After intensive training, Robles found that he could use his unusually high center of gravity to defend against attack, and became skilled at several offensive moves including one he created. In his sophomore year, Robles was ranked sixth in Arizona, and won two state wrestling championships going 96–0 in his junior and senior years combined at Mesa High School. Robles won a national championship as a senior, finishing his high school wrestling career with a record of 129–15.

Arizona State
Despite Robles' great high school success, none of his top choices for college—Iowa, Oklahoma State, and Columbia—recruited him, likely because of his missing leg. Robles redshirted as a freshman at Arizona State University, and finished 6th in the 2006 FILA Junior World Championships in the 55 kg Freestyle Wrestling category. He started his collegiate wrestling career in 2007–08, where he was nationally ranked  and finished the year with a record of 25–11, falling just short of being named as an All-American. In his second competitive year as a collegiate wrestler (2008–2009), Robles earned All-American Honors, finishing the year 29–8, winning the Pacific-10 Conference championship at 125 pounds and finishing fourth in the NCAA Championship's 125 pound weight class tournament. In 2009–10, Robles again earned All-American honors, finishing seventh in the NCAA 125 pound weight class, going 32–4 on the season, and repeating as the Pac-10 125 pound wrestling champion.

In Robles' final year of eligibility (2010–11), he went undefeated, going 36–0 on the year,  becoming a three-time Pac-10 champion (defeating Jason Lara from Oregon State in the final, and a national champion, defeating the defending 125-pound NCAA Champion, Iowa's Matt McDonough, 7–1 in the final. For his efforts, Robles was voted the Tournament's Most Outstanding Wrestler.

The 5'8" Robles concluded his Arizona State wrestling career with a record of 122–23, a three-time Pac-10 wrestling champion as well as a three-time All-American. Robles ranks 8th for most match wins by an Arizona State wrestler.

Future
Robles has stated that he wishes to become a motivational speaker, specifically for those who face similar challenges. “" My spirit is unconquerable...I don't care what's probable. Through blood, sweat, and tears, I am unstoppable." is the quote from Robles's book Unstoppable that he says is the overall message of the book.

Anthony Robles has been a commentator of the NCAA Division I Wrestling Championships since 2012.

Robles set the world record for most pull-ups in one minute, with 62, at halftime of a New York Jets game in November 2018.

Awards and honors
In January 2012, Robles was presented the 2011 Most Courageous Athlete Award by the Philadelphia Sports Writers Association.

See also

 Jim Abbott, a former Major League Baseball pitcher born with only one hand
 Pete Gray, Major League Baseball outfielder missing his right arm
 Bert Shepard, who pitched in one game for the Washington Senators in 1945 after losing his right leg to amputation during World War II
 Casey Martin, a disabled golfer
 Oscar Pistorius, a runner with no legs
 Faldir Chahbari, a kickboxer with one functioning eye
 Kevin Laue, a basketball player with one hand
 Dave Stevens, a baseball and football player without legs
 Nick Newell, a mixed martial artist with one hand
 Shaquem Griffin, an American football player with one hand
 Hari Budha Magar, a high altitude mountaineer and double above-knee amputee

References

External links
  by Snap Judgment

1988 births
Living people
Sportspeople from Mesa, Arizona
Sportspeople with limb difference
American male sport wrestlers
American people with disabilities
American amputees
Arizona State Sun Devils wrestlers
Mesa High School alumni
African-American sport wrestlers